This is a list of U.S. state, federal district, and territory flowers.

See also
List of U.S. state trees
Lists of U.S. state insignia

References

External links
List of state flowers

U.S. state flowers
Flowers
.